Zeerijp is a village north of city of Groningen. Its most striking building is its brick church for the 14th century with detached bell tower. Formerly dedicated to John the Baptist, now it is a Dutch Reformed church. Also there is a famous organ inside the church, a Faber organ. Because there are so few inhabitants, Zeerijp has no shops, but there is a primary school 'De Wilgenstee' and a cafe. Also, there is a famous mill, 'de Leeuw'. There is also a gold and silver smith, Van Hulsen.

Zeerijp's most recently made the headlines when an earthquake struck the village in January 2007. Earthquakes are extremely rare in the Netherlands; this one, measuring 2.3 on the Richter magnitude scale, was a result of drilling for natural gas.

History 
The village was first mentioned in the 10th or 11th century Ripon as means "sea bank". Zeerijp was located on the former Fivel estuary which was connected to the sea It is a dike village which developed into a stretched out settlement.

It was restored between 1974 and 1977.

Zeerijp was home to 508 people in 1840.

Gallery

References

External links 
 
  Local information

Populated places in Groningen (province)
Eemsdelta